Mabalingwe Nature Reserve, is located 38 km west of Bela Bela, in the Limpopo province of South Africa, and is about 12,000 hectare in area. It is in an easily accessible, malaria-free area of the Transvaal bushveld, around an hour-and-a-half drive from Johannesburg.

Mabalingwe means "leopard spot." The name comes from the phrase "mabala ya ingwe" - mabala means "spot" in Tswana and ingwe is Zulu for "leopard."

History 
Mabalingwe was originally a maize and game farm of 2,141 hectares, named Boschpoort, which was founded by the Wessels family in 1972. Originally, the only animals on the farm were kudu and impala.

In 1987, Basie Wessels developed Boschpoort into a vacation resort. The first 10 boshutte (chalets) were finished in 1988. In 1989, hippopotamuses, rhinoceroses, and sable were brought in.

By 1994, there were around 105 units set up. Parts of the farm were sold to sole proprietors to build houses. The farm was also enlarged then by the purchase of the neighboring Gorcum farm.

In 1994, Basie's son, an architect by profession, returned to the farm to develop an Caravan park. That year, Olievenfontein was purchased and added to the development. Elephants, their population decimated in Kruger National Park, were rescued in Mabalingwe in 1995. In 1999, disease-free African buffalo began being bred in Hoedspruit, Limpopo, after which some of those buffalo were settled in Mabalingwe.

The Itaga lodge opened in 2000, and two new lodges, namely Boekenhoutplaat and Elandsfontein, were added as well. In 2003, Cyferfontein was developed. By this time, Mabalingwe had grown to around 12,500 hectares.

Basie Wessels, Mabalingwe's first owner, died in April 2008 in a tragic autogyro crash.

Wildlife 
Wildlife include the big five game: lion, leopard, buffalo, elephant and rhinoceros, but also hippo, giraffe, hyena, warthog and impala to name but a few of the 36 species of mammals. For bird lovers there are more than 220 species of birds to be spotted.

There are popular game drives in open 4x4 vehicles, conference facilities, a large restaurant, a pub, and swimming pools.

Lodgings 
The reserve includes several sorts of timeshare properties in thatched chalets, including some close to the main complex and others deeper in the reserve for privacy and calm.

The main complex includes 34 thatched chalets, each with its own bathroom, and divided into four areas:
 Ingwe (Leopard camp) is near the chief complex
 Kubu (Hippo Creek)
 Phiri (Hyena camp) furthest into the forest
 Kwalata (Sable camp)

Facilities 
Mabalingwe includes the following facilities:

 Caravan park
 Several hot tubs and swimming pools
 Tennis and squash courts
 Miniature golf course
 Store
 Restaurant and ladies' bar overlooking the dams
 Safari launch point
Self catering units

See also 
 Protected areas of South Africa

External links 
 Official website

References

Nature reserves in South Africa